Zhag'yab County (Tibetan: བྲག་གཡབ་རྫོང་ Wylie brag g-yab rdzong), also spelled Chagyab, is a county of the Chamdo Prefecture in  the Tibet Autonomous Region, China. One of the villages in the county is Korra.

Counties of Tibet
Chamdo